The Downtown Manhattan Heliport  (Downtown Manhattan/Wall St. Heliport) is a helicopter landing platform at Pier 6 in the East River in Lower Manhattan, New York, New York.

History 
Downtown Manhattan Heliport opened on December 8, 1960, supplementing the heliport at West 30th Street that had opened in 1956. In the 1960s and 1970s New York Airways helicopters flew from the heliport to Newark Liberty International Airport (EWR), LaGuardia Airport (LGA) and John F. Kennedy International Airport (JFK); scheduled flights ended in the mid-1980s. In 2006 US Helicopter resumed scheduled passenger service with hourly flights to JFK until November 2009 when it ceased all service.

Much of the heliport's traffic is generated by Wall Street and the lower Manhattan financial district; top business executives and time-sensitive document deliveries often use the heliport. The heliport is the normal landing spot for the President of the United States on visits to New York. Former New York City Mayor Michael Bloomberg frequently used the heliport to fly between Bloomberg L.P. headquarters and Johns Hopkins University when he was chairman of both institutions.

The Downtown Manhattan Heliport is a public heliport operated by the New York City Economic Development Corporation (NYCEDC) with charter service to Newark Liberty International Airport, Teterboro Airport, Morristown Municipal Airport, and other New York–area airports. Public sightseeing and VIP flights are also common.

Facilities
It has one helipad, H1,  concrete. In the year ending December 30, 2003, the airport had 10,002 aircraft operations, average 27 per day: 90% general aviation and 10% military.

The New York City Economic Development Corporation estimates over 56,000 sightseeing helicopter trips in 2014 operated from the Downtown Manhattan Heliport. This excludes helicopters used by the police and hospitals, or even private business and leisure charters. In 2014, nontourist flights accounted for 1,936 of the 58,021 flights from the downtown heliport.

See also 
 East 34th Street Heliport
 West 30th Street Heliport

References 
Notes

External links 

Airports in New York City
Transportation buildings and structures in Manhattan
Port Authority of New York and New Jersey
Heliports in New York (state)
Piers in New York City
1960 establishments in New York City
Financial District, Manhattan